Mediavia discalis is a species of snout moth in the genus Mediavia. It was described by George Hampson in 1906. It is found in French Guiana.

References

Moths described in 1906
Epipaschiinae